Alvania porcupinae is a species of minute sea snail, a marine gastropod mollusc or micromollusk in the family Rissoidae.

Distribution
This species occurs in European waters.

References

 Gofas, S.; Le Renard, J.; Bouchet, P. (2001). Mollusca, in: Costello, M.J. et al. (Ed.) (2001). European register of marine species: a check-list of the marine species in Europe and a bibliography of guides to their identification. Collection Patrimoines Naturels, 50: pp. 180–213
 Sysoev A.V. (2014). Deep-sea fauna of European seas: An annotated species check-list of benthic invertebrates living deeper than 2000 m in the seas bordering Europe. Gastropoda. Invertebrate Zoology. Vol.11. No.1: 134–155

External links
 Gofas S. & Warén A. (1982). Taxonomie de quelque espèces du genre Alvania (Mollusca, Gastropoda) des côtes ibériques et marocaines. Bollettino Malacologico. 18(1-4): 1-16
  http://www.biodiversitylibrary.org/page/28689962
 Gofas, S.; Le Renard, J.; Bouchet, P. (2001). Mollusca. in: Costello, M.J. et al. (eds), European Register of Marine Species: a check-list of the marine species in Europe and a bibliography of guides to their identification. Patrimoines Naturels. 50: 180-213
 Hoenselaar H.J. & Goud J. (1998). The Rissoidae of the CANCAP expeditions, I: the genus Alvania Risso, 1826 (Gastropoda, Prosobranchia). Basteria. 62(1-2): 69-115.
  Serge GOFAS, Ángel A. LUQUE, Joan Daniel OLIVER,José TEMPLADO & Alberto SERRA (2021) - The Mollusca of Galicia Bank (NE Atlantic Ocean); European Journal of Taxonomy 785: 1–114

Rissoidae
Gastropods described in 1982
Gastropods of Europe